Wettersteinplatz is an U-Bahn station in Munich on the U1.

References

Munich U-Bahn stations
Railway stations in Germany opened in 1997
Buildings and structures completed in 1997